Tan Boen Soan (25June190512August1952) was an ethnic Chinese Malay-language writer and journalist from Sukabumi, Java. He was the author of works such as Koetoekannja Boenga Srigading (1933), Bergerak (1935), Digdaja (1935) and Tjoban (1936). He later wrote for the Sunday Courier of Jakarta.

Biography
Tan was born in Sukabumi, West Java, on 25 June 1905. He began his education in a Hollandsche Chineesche School, a school for ethnic Chinese children run by the colonial government of the Dutch East Indies, there. Aside from his studies, he also active in the student organisation Chung Hsioh. He later attended the Koningin Wilhelminaschool in Batavia (now Jakarta). Afterwards he spent some time working for the rail line Staats Spoorwagen in the city, before returning to Sukabumi and writing articles for the Chinese-owned dailies Sin Po and Perniagaan.

In 1920 Tan became a member of the editorial board for the Bandung-based Sin Bin; he stayed with the newspaper until it closed, migrating to Keng Po. In 1928 he produced an adaptation of Tjoe Hong Bok's novel Setangan Berloemoer Darah, a story in which a son attempts to avenge his father's murder. This silent film in black-and-white was the second adaptation of a novel in the Indies.

Through the 1930s, Tan headed a variety of publications, including Warna Warta (1931–32), the Sukabumi-based biweekly Asia, and the Semarang-based Soeara Semarang.

Tan's 1935 novel  criticised the tendency for ethnic Chinese in the Indies to value money too greatly. Another of his novels, Bwee Ha (1940), warned of the risks of rejecting tradition and the "natural order". However, he also saw the dangers of blindly adhering to tradition, and his  (1933) urged that divorced or widowed women be allowed to remarry – something forbidden at the time. Chinese nationalist themes, likely included as a protest against the 1933 Japanese occupation of Jehol, can be seen in his silat novel Pendekar Merah (1935). Tan's 1935 novel Bergerak focused on the role of women in social movements; this novel was republished in 2002 as in the sixth volume of the anthology series Kesastraan Melayu Tionghoa dan Kebangsaan Indonesia.

Sukarno proclaimed Indonesian independence in 1945, and this was recognised by the Dutch in 1949. During this time frame Tan headed Sin Min in Semarang. He also contributed writings to the Jakarta-based Sedar and the Sunday Courier. In 1951 Tan was accused of being a member of "Barisan Tjitaroem", considered a subversive group by the Indonesian government. He was imprisoned and tortured before being released. Tan died not long afterwards, on 12 August 1952.

Partial bibliography
 (98 pages)
 (104 pages)
 (126 pages)
 (115 pages)
 (121 pages)
 (128 pages; adapted from The Kreutzer Sonata by Leo Tolstoy)
 (101 pages)
 (131 pages)
 (102 pages)
 (118 pages)
 (116 pages)
 (112 pages; sequel to Digdaja)
 (110 pages)
 (121 pages; based on Claude Anet's Mayerling)
 (98 pages)
 (120 pages)
 (104 pages)
 (109 pages)
 (138 pages)

References

Indonesian people of Chinese descent
Indonesian Hokkien people
Indonesian male novelists
Indonesian male writers
1905 births
1952 deaths
Indonesian journalists
People from Sukabumi
20th-century novelists
20th-century male writers
20th-century journalists